Patrick Conroy is the name of:

Patrick J. Conroy (born 1950), 60th Chaplain of the United States House of Representatives
Pat Conroy (1945–2016), author
Patsy Conroy (Patrick Conroy, c. 1846–?), American burglar and river pirate
Pat Conroy (politician) (born 1979), Australian politician